2020 Love You Love You, is the first EP by Singaporean duo, By2. It was released on August 3, 2012 consisting of 4 new songs with two promotional singles.

Background
Before the actual release date of the EP, a limited edition of the album was released first on July 3, 2012. On August 3, 2012, the album was released physically in two versions, a Miko and Yumi version. Both of the versions comes with a large photo albums. On August 10, 2012, By2 held a showcase in Beijing to promote the album.

Composition
The EP features a total of 4 tracks with the title track of the same name as the EP written and composed by By2 themselves. The EP opens with 2020 Love You Love You (2020愛你愛妳), a bubblegum dance track, about having fun in the summer.  The second track, You Don't Know Me (你並不懂我), is a ballad track, the lyrics of the song are about realisation at a man who does not know them despite being with them. The third track, Touching the Heart Touches Love (觸動心 觸動愛), is a fast paced, bubblegum pop track and the last track, Love Broke In (愛情闖進門), is a track with saccharine-like melody and piano interlude. Both the third and fourth track are about having a crush on a boy and leave little impression.

Track listing 
※ Bold track title means it is the title track in the album.

References

2012 EPs
By2 albums
Chinese-language EPs